Mehmood Khan (born 10 June 1991) is a Pakistani footballer who plays for Khan Research Laboratories as a midfielder. He won three consecutive league titles with Khan Research Laboratories in 2011–12, 2012–13 and 2013–14, as well as three national cups in 2012, 2015 and 2016.

Khan got his first international cap against Yemen in 2018 FIFA World Cup qualifiers on 23 March 2015.

International career
Khan first represented Pakistan at the 2014 Asian Games as part of national U-23 team against China U-23 on 22 September 2014, in a 1–0 loss.

Khan got his first senior team match on 23 March 2015 in a 0–0 draw against Yemen for 2018 FIFA World Cup qualifiers.

International

Honours
Khan Research Laboratories
 Pakistan Premier League: 2011–12, 2012–13, 2013–14
 National Football Challenge Cup: 2012, 2015, 2016

References

Pakistani footballers
Pakistan international footballers
1989 births
Living people
Afghan FC Chaman players
K-Electric F.C. players
Khan Research Laboratories F.C. players
Footballers at the 2010 Asian Games
Footballers at the 2014 Asian Games
Association football midfielders
Footballers at the 2018 Asian Games
Asian Games competitors for Pakistan
South Asian Games gold medalists for Pakistan
South Asian Games medalists in football
SSGC F.C. players